Röskva is a student body organization at the University of Iceland that has had a list to the Student Council of the UI since 1988. The tag-line of the organization is Organization of socially minded students at the University of Iceland. Röskva is currently in majority of the Student Council.

Röskva nominates to the paid positions at the Student Council's Office.

History

Röskva was founded in February the year 1988 when two movements merged, The organization of left people and Reformists decided that combined they would be a bigger force to compete against Vaka, the organization of democratic students. The first chair of the organization was Þórunn Sveinbjarnardóttir the former Environment minister in the government of Geir Haarde. Röskva first was in the majority in 1992 and kept it until 2002, when Vaka regained its majority. Röskva got the majority again in the spring of 2007 and kept it until the spring of 2009. In 2017, Röskva won the election to the Student Council after eight years in minority, and received 18 of the 27 student councils members, which was at the time the biggest victory in Röskva's history. In 2018, the organization won again and held the majority with 18 members. Röskva's biggest victory came in 2021 where they won 16 of 17 seats available. 

The organization opposes school admission fees and advocates for general access to university education. It is Röskva's opinion that the Student Council should not only exert itself within the University of Iceland but outside of it as well.

Chair of the Student Council for Röskva
 1991-1992 – Steinunn Valdís Óskarsdóttir
 1992-1993 – Pétur Þ. Óskarsson
 1993-1994 – Páll Magnússon
 1994-1995 – Dagur B. Eggertsson
 1995-1996 – Guðmundur Steingrímsson
 1996-1997 – Vilhjálmur H. Vilhjálmsson
 1997-1998 – Haraldur Guðni Eiðsson
 1998-1999 – Ásdís Magnúsdóttir
 1999-2000 – Finnur Beck
 2000-2001 – Eiríkur Jónsson
 2001-2002 – Þorvarður Tjörvi Ólafsson
 2007-2008 – Dagný Ósk Aradóttir
 2008-2009 – Björg Magnúsdóttir
 2017-2018 – Ragna Sigurðardóttir
 2018-2019 – Elísabet Brynjarsdóttir
 2019-2020 – Jóna Þórey Pétursdóttir
 2020-2021 – Isabel Alejandra Diaz
 2021-2022 – Isabel Alejandra Diaz
 2022-2023 – Rebekka Karlsdóttir

External links
 roskva.hi.is

University of Iceland